Jorge Marcelo Vitorino (born 7 October 1999) is a Macanese footballer who currently plays as a forward for Lun Lok.

Career statistics

Club

Notes

International

References

1999 births
Living people
Macau footballers
Macau international footballers
Association football forwards